Jason T. Evans is a retired United States Army lieutenant general who last served as the deputy chief of staff for installations (G-9) of the United States Army. Previously, he was the commanding general of the United States Army Human Resources Command.

References

Lieutenant generals
Living people
Place of birth missing (living people)
Recipients of the Distinguished Service Medal (US Army)
Recipients of the Legion of Merit
United States Army generals
United States Army personnel of the Iraq War
Year of birth missing (living people)